The United States Army Drill Team is a 19-member precision drill platoon which represents the United States Army at official occasions. It is officially part of the Headquarters Company, 4th Battalion, 3rd U.S. Infantry Regiment (The Old Guard). Members of the platoon can come from any Military Occupational Specialty (MOS). The platoon use a M1903 Springfield.

Performances
Regiment officials have said that on any given year, the team participates in over 100 ceremonies, including professional and collegiate sporting events, JROTC or ROTC events, parades and community outreach events. The platoon performs annually at the Twilight Tattoo held in late May and early June, as well as the Spirit of America festival in September. The U.S. Army Drill Team was created to concentrate on precise marching and crisp rifle drill. They have supported The Old Guard's ceremonial missions, and public duties for over 50 years.

Training
Soldiers are selected for this unit after 6 months of drill practice. Trim military bearing, strength, and dexterity are mandatory requirements for qualification in the platoon. A typical training day begins at 5 a.m. and runs to 11:30 a.m., when the team takes a break for lunch. Training then continues from 1 to 5 p.m.. Potential candidates for the drill team are required to memorize the first 6 to 7 minutes of the regular drill (which amounts to 12 to 14 minutes).

Gallery

Related Articles
 Joint Base Anacostia–Bolling
 United States Army Band
 United States Marine Corps Silent Drill Platoon
 3rd U.S. Infantry Regiment (The Old Guard)
 United States Air Force Honor Guard
 United States Coast Guard Ceremonial Honor Guard
 United States Navy Ceremonial Guard

References and Notes

External links

 
 History of the 3rd Regiment of Infantry
 U.S. Army Drill Team Performs • Spirit of America 2014
 Honor Guard - Army Drill Team - 6/14/17
 US Army Drill Team Performing at Wofford College Half Time Show 2-20-18

United States Army
Ceremonial units of the United States military
Military units and formations of the United States Army